Ottawa/Manotick (Hope Field) Aerodrome  is a small airport located  southwest of Manotick, Ontario, Canada, south of Ottawa.

See also
 List of airports in the Ottawa area

References

Registered aerodromes in Ontario
Russell, Ontario